Eugen Zasavițchi (born 24 November 1992) is a Moldovan football midfielder who plays for Dacia Buiucani.

References

External links
 
 Eugen Zasavițchi at fkt.lt
 
 
 

1992 births
Living people
Footballers from Chișinău
Moldovan footballers
Association football midfielders
Moldova international footballers
Moldovan expatriate footballers
Expatriate footballers in Lithuania
Expatriate footballers in Poland
Expatriate footballers in Estonia
Expatriate footballers in Belarus
Expatriate footballers in Romania
Moldovan expatriate sportspeople in Lithuania
Moldovan expatriate sportspeople in Poland
Moldovan expatriate sportspeople in Estonia
Moldovan expatriate sportspeople in Belarus
Moldovan expatriate sportspeople in Romania
Moldovan Super Liga players
A Lyga players
I liga players
Meistriliiga players
Liga II players
FC Veris Chișinău players
FK Riteriai players
GKS Tychy players
FC Dacia Chișinău players
FK Jonava players
FC Zimbru Chișinău players
Nõmme Kalju FC players
FC Dnyapro Mogilev players
CS Minaur Baia Mare (football) players
FC Petrolul Ploiești players
FC Milsami Orhei players
Dacia Buiucani players